Mikheil Kakhiani (1896 – December, 1937) was a Soviet and Georgian politician. He served as First Secretary of the Georgian Communist Party from August 1924 to May 1930.

A strong supporter of Joseph Stalin, Kakhiani ensured that after the 1924 August Uprising there would be no dissent from Georgia towards the Bolsheviks. He launched the collectivization of Georgian farms in 1931 and farmers were relocated to state-run farms while their produce, farming tools, and fields were destroyed. Those who resisted were deported to Siberia. Along with the party leadership, he also directed the cruel suppression of rebels and personally witnessed the execution of prisoners such as the shooting of Menshevik prisoners at Tbilisi.

In 1937 he was shot as part of the Great Purge. An account cited the weak leadership of Kakhiani along with Petre Aghniashvili and Mamia Orakhelasvili as a factor that helped the rise of Lavrentiy Beria.

Notes

References
 

1896 births
1937 deaths
20th-century politicians from Georgia (country)
First Secretaries of the Georgian Communist Party
Great Purge victims from Georgia (country)
People from Batumi
Soviet politicians
Bolsheviks